Santa Marina del Rey is a municipality located in the province of León, Castile and León, Spain. According to the 2004 census (INE), the municipality has a population of 2,350 inhabitants.

References

External links 
 Official website

Municipalities in the Province of León